Greasewood Finnish Apostolic Lutheran Church is a historic pioneer church located  west of Adams, Oregon.  It was built by volunteers on donated land in 1884 to serve the immigrant Finnish Laestadian community.  Services were held in Finnish both for the immigrants and their children, whose mother tongue was also Finnish.  After breakups within the Laestadian community, this church affiliated with the Apostolic Lutheran Church of America.  Due to the remote location, preachers from surrounding areas as well as the American Midwest, and even as far away as Finland, were brought in to speak.

As noted in an article published in the East Oregonian, "The ministers who served the congregation are remembered for preaching the [A]postolic [Lutheran] faith which stressed confession, repentance and forgiveness."

The church was added to the National Register in 1988.

References

Finnish-American history
Lutheran churches in Oregon
Churches on the National Register of Historic Places in Oregon
Carpenter Gothic church buildings in Oregon
Churches completed in 1884
Buildings and structures in Umatilla County, Oregon
Laestadianism
National Register of Historic Places in Umatilla County, Oregon
1884 establishments in Oregon